Beachcroft is a surname. Notable people by that name include:

 C. B. K. Beachcroft (1870–1928), captain of the Great Britain cricket team.
 Nina Beachcroft (born 1931), English children's writer. 
 George Beachcroft (1871–1941), administrator of the Richmond Football Club.
 Matthews Beachcroft, governor of the Bank of England from 1756 to 1758.
 Samuel Beachcroft (died 1796), governor of the Bank of England from 1775 to 1777.

See also
 Beachcroft (disambiguation)

English-language surnames